The Parom (ferry in Russian) is a space tug that has been proposed by RKK Energia.  The purpose of this vehicle is to replace most of the Progress' active components. Progress spacecraft have flown re-supply missions since 1978. Nikolai Bryukhanov, RKK Energia's deputy general designer, said in May 2005 that the Federal Space Agency had received a design for a new space system. According to him, the system's operation principle is completely different from that used by Progress. A launch vehicle first places a Parom reusable inter-orbit "tug" into a 200 km orbit. As this spacecraft will not carry any consignments, other rockets will orbit payload containers that will be docked by Parom. The tug will then deliver them to the ISS or another orbiter.

"Any Russian or foreign launch vehicle can orbit such containers," Bryukhanov said. The size of the container and its shape depend on payload characteristics. "This can be an airtight instrument module or a fuel tanker," the deputy general designer continued. "Moreover, depressurized platform featuring large scientific equipment and auxiliary systems, i.e., solar batteries that cannot be stored inside the airtight module".

In layout, the Parom will be built around a pressurized transfer passage with docking ports at each end: each of these two docking ports can be used to dock with the cargo container, the Kliper, the space station or any other spacecraft. It will have its own engines, along with propellant transfer lines to feed fuel from the cargo container into its own tanks or into the space station's  or another spacecraft's tank. It will also have engines scaled to handle cargo modules weighing up to 30 tonnes (around 60,000 pounds), twice the mass of the largest station sections carried into orbit aboard Space Shuttles and Proton rockets.

See also
Kliper Proposed spacecraft to use the Parom

External links
Russian Space Web
Flight International Article, Lighter Kliper could make toward trip to ISS
MSN Article on Kliper

Space program of Russia
Hypothetical spacecraft
Space tugs